Rahmaniyah Island of Jazīrat ar Raḩmānīyah (Arabic: جزيرة الرحمانية) is an island in the Rosetta branch of the Nile River in Egypt, Markaz (region) of Rahmaniya in Beheira Governorate. It is located just south of Desouk City and north of El Rahmaniya.

References

River islands of Egypt
Islands of the Nile